Copeland Special is an album released by Johnny Copeland in 1981 on Rounder Records in the United States, Demon Records in the United Kingdom, and Black and Blue Records in France. It was recorded and mixed at Blank Tapes, 37 West 20th Street, NYC, and produced by Dan Doyle. The album won a W. C. Handy Award.

Track listing
"Claim Jumper" 		
"I Wish I Was Single"
"Everybody Wants A Piece Of Me"
"Copeland Special"
"It´s My Own Tears"
"Third Party"
"Big Time"
"Down On Bended Knee"
"Done Got Over It"
"St. Louis Blues"

Personnel
Johnny Copeland - guitar, vocals
John Leibman - guitar
Don Whitcomb - bass
Mansfield Hitchman - drums (except on tracks 1, 3, 5, 7)
Candy McDonald - drums on tracks 1, 3, 5
Julian Vaughan - drums on track 7
Anthony Browne - organ on tracks 2, 5
Ken Vangel - piano arrangements
Brookly Slim - harmonica on track 4
George Adams - tenor & soprano saxophone
Arthur Blythe - alto saxophone
Byard Lancaster - alto & tenor saxophone
Joe Rigby - baritone saxophone
Bill Ohashi, Garrett List - trombone
John Pratt, Yusef Yancey - trumpet

References

External links
http://www.discogs.com/Johnny-Copeland-Copeland-Special/release/2878978
Official Johnny Copeland site

1981 albums
Johnny Copeland albums
Rounder Records albums